Rush is a New Zealand television channel owned and operated by Warner Bros. Discovery, broadcast via the state-owned Kordia transmission network, Sky and on the website ThreeNow. The channel launched on 21 March 2022. Rush focuses on adventure shows such as Man vs Wild, Manhunt With Joel Lambert, Deadliest Catch and Treehouse Masters.

The channel shares its name, partial ownership and some of its programming with Australian TV channel 9Rush.

History 
In 2021, Discovery New Zealand announced its plans to restructure several of its TV channels for 2022, including the addition of Rush, intended to reach a younger male audience. Rush launched on 21 March 2022. After the closure of The Edge TV, Breeze TV and the rebranding of Choice TV, Rush (with sister channel eden) started transmission on old Choice TV Freeview channel 14 and Sky TV channel 24.

References

External links

Warner Bros. Discovery Asia-Pacific
2022 establishments in New Zealand
Television networks in New Zealand
Television channels and stations established in 2022